Aftab Ahmed may refer to:

Cricketers
 Aftab Ahmed (Bangladeshi cricketer) (born 1985), Bangladeshi Test cricketer
 Aftab Ahmed (cricketer, born 1931), Pakistani cricketer for Punjab University
 Aftab Ahmed (cricketer, born 1967), Pakistani-born Danish international cricketer
 Aftab Ahmed (cricketer, born 1983), Pakistani cricketer for Public Works Department
 Aftab Ahmed (cricketer, born 1990), Danish international cricketer
 Aftab Ahmed (HBFC and Income Tax Department cricketer), Pakistani cricketer 
 Aftab Ahmed (Karachi cricketer), Pakistani cricketer
 Aftab Ahmed (Uttar Pradesh cricketer), Indian cricketer 
 Aftab Ahmed (1950s Peshawar cricketer), Pakistani cricketer for Peshawar
 Aftab Ahmed (1970s Jammu and Kashmir cricketer), Indian cricketer 
 Aftab Ahmed (1980s Jammu and Kashmir cricketer), Indian cricketer

Other people 
 Aftab Ahmed (photojournalist) (c. 1934 – 2013), Bangladeshi photojournalist
 Aftab Ahmed (academic) (1949–2006), Bangladeshi academic

See also